is the third single of the subgroup Pucchimoni. It was released on February 28, 2001 and sold 429,270 copies.

Track listing 
All songs are composed and written by Tsunku. "Baby! Koi ni Knock Out!" was arranged by Konishi Takao, "Waltz! Ahiru ga Sanba" was arranged by Takahashi Yuichi.
 
 
 "Baby! Koi ni Knock Out!" (Instrumental)

Members at the time of single

External links 
 Discography entry on Hello! Project official website

Petitmoni songs
Zetima Records singles
2001 singles
Oricon Weekly number-one singles
Japanese-language songs
Song recordings produced by Tsunku
Songs written by Tsunku
2001 songs
Juice=Juice songs